Maddison Weatherall (born 10 September 2001) is a New Zealand rugby league footballer who plays as a  for the St George Illawarra Dragons in the NRL Women's Premiership and the Canterbury-Bankstown Bulldogs in the NSWRL Women's Premiership.

Background
Born in Auckland, Weatherall was raised in Wollongong and played her junior rugby league for the Western Suburbs Red Devils.

Playing career
In 2018, Weatherall played for the Illawarra Steelers in the Tarsha Gale Cup. Later that year, she joined the St George Illawarra Dragons NRL Women's Premiership squad as a development player.

2019
In 2019, Weatherall once again played for the Steelers' Tarsha Gale Cup team, captaining the side in their Grand Final win over the Newcastle Knights. 
On 18 June, she was promoted to the Dragons 22-woman squad.

On 21 June, she captained the New South Wales under-18 team in their 24–4 win over Queensland in the inaugural Under-18 State of Origin game.

In Round 1 of the 2019 NRL Women's season, Weatherall made her debut for the Dragons in a 4–14 loss to the Brisbane Broncos. On 6 October, she came off the bench in the Dragons' 6–30 Grand Final loss to the Broncos.

2020
In 2020, Weatherall joined the Canterbury-Bankstown Bulldogs NRL Women's Premiership team. On 22 February, she came off the bench for the Māori All Stars in their 4–10 loss to the Indigenous All Stars.

References

External links
St George Illawarra Dragons profile

2001 births
Living people
New Zealand Māori rugby league players
New Zealand female rugby league players
Rugby league props
Rugby league locks
St. George Illawarra Dragons (NRLW) players